Gary Nathan Calkins (18 January 1869 – 4 January 1943) was an American protozoologist and a professor at Columbia University. He wrote several landmark textbooks on the biology of the protozoa. He described conjugation in Paramoecium and in his taxonomic approach separated chlorophyll containing flagellates from other protists.

Calkins was born in Valparaiso, Indiana to John Wesley Calkins and Emma Frisbie Smith He graduated from Massachusetts Institute of Technology in 1890 and taught for a while. He worked briefly at the Marine Biological Laboratory, Woods Hole, and then continued further studies at Columbia University and obtained a Ph.D. in 1897. His influences at Columbia included Henry Fairfield Osborn. He rose to professor of zoology in 1904 which was later renamed as professor of protozoology. He worked at Columbia University for most of his life retiring as an emeritus professor in 1939. He also took an interest in statistics and worked as a consultant in cancer research with the New York State Department of Health from 1902 to 1908. His major books were The Protozoa (1901) and The Biology of the Protozoa (1926). One of his most important works was in the study of protistan life-histories and the description of conjugation.

He is honoured in the name of Calkinsia which is a monotypic genus of excavates comprising the single species Calkinsia aureus.

References

External links 
 The biology of the Protozoa (1926)
 Biology (1917)
 The Protozoa (1901)
 NAS Biography
 Portrait, Smithsonian Archives Embryo Project Encyclopedia

1869 births
1943 deaths
American microbiologists
Massachusetts Institute of Technology alumni
Columbia University alumni
Columbia University faculty